Bethel High School was established in 1922 as part of the Bethel Mission in Shanghai, by Shi Meiyu (Mary Stone, or Shek Mei Yuk in Cantonese) and the American missionary Jennie V. Hughes. It later moved to Hong Kong in 1950.

References

Protestant secondary schools in Hong Kong
Educational institutions established in 1922
1922 establishments in Hong Kong